Rebecca Marder (born 10 April 1995) is a French film and stage actress.

Early life and education 
Rebecca Marder was born on 10 April 1995 in Paris, France. Marder is the daughter of American musician Marc Marder and French journalist and theatre critic Mathilde La Bardonnie, who worked for Le Monde and later Libération. Her father is Jewish and her mother Catholic. Marder grew up in France and is a dual citizen of France and the United States.

Between 2008 and 2011, Marder was trained at the Conservatoire à rayonnement communal du 13e arrondissement de Paris. She later studied literature and cinema but interrupted her studies in September 2014 to join the drama school of the National Theatre of Strasbourg, where she studied for ten months.

Career 
Marder began her acting career at the age of five. She appeared as Charlotte in the Rodolphe Marconi film Ceci est mon corps (2001). In 2007, she starred in Demandez la permission aux enfants alongside Pascal Légitimus and Sandrine Bonnaire. In 2010, she starred in The Round Up together with Jean Reno and Mélanie Laurent. In 2012, she received the Prix du jeune espoir féminin at the Festival de la fiction TV de La Rochelle for her performance in Alain Tasma's television film Emma.

Marder was discovered by Éric Ruf, general administrator of the Comédie-Française, and chosen after a collective audition. She signed her contract on 19 June 2015, becoming a salaried actress of the Comédie-Française troupe. At 20 years old, she became one the youngest pensionnaires in its history, and the youngest of the troupe's then 59 actors. She debuted in the role of Lucietta in Carlo Goldoni's Les Rustres. She regularly appeared on stage there in classical roles, including as Claudine in Molière's George Dandin ou le Mari confondu and La Jalousie du Barbouillé, Atalide in Jean Racine's Bajazet and Hermione in Euripides' Electra and Orestes. In 2022, Marder announced her resignation from the Comédie-Française.

In 2020, Marder was a narrator of the Cambodian documentary film Irradiated, which competed for the Golden Bear in the main competition section at the 70th Berlin International Film Festival. Marder's father composed the film's score. In 2021, Marder appeared in the lead role of Sandrine Kiberlain's feature directorial debut A Radiant Girl, in which she plays a Jewish girl who aspires to become an actress in Paris during the German occupation in 1942. The film premiered in the International Critics' Week section of the 2021 Cannes Film Festival, where it competed for the Caméra d'Or.

Performances

Film

Television

Stage

Awards and nominations

References

External links 
 
 

1995 births
Living people
21st-century French actresses
Actresses from Paris
French film actresses
French stage actresses
French people of Jewish descent
Troupe of the Comédie-Française
French people of American descent
Citizens of the United States through descent